Wladimir Ramon Pinto (born February 12, 1998) is a Venezuelan professional baseball pitcher for the Long Island Ducks of the Atlantic League of Professional Baseball.

Career

Detroit Tigers
Pinto signed with the Detroit Tigers as an international free agent in 2014. He played for the Venezuelan Summer League Tigers in 2015, going 2–1 with a 3.90 ERA over  innings. In 2016, he played for the Gulf Coast Tigers and went 1–1 with a 2.66 ERA over  innings. He split the 2017 season between the Connecticut Tigers and the West Michigan Whitecaps, going a combined 1–0 with a 0.00 ERA over 10 innings. He split the 2018 season between West Michigan and the Lakeland Flying Tigers, going a combined 4–2 with a 4.50 ERA and 77 strikeouts over 50 innings. He split the 2019 season between Lakeland and the Erie SeaWolves, going a combined 3–4 with a 2.34 ERA and 87 strikeouts over  innings. He played for the Mesa Solar Sox in the Arizona Fall League following the 2019 season. Pinto did not play in 2020 due to the cancellation of the minor league season because of the COVID-19 pandemic. Pinto spent the majority of the 2021 season with the Triple-A Toledo Mud Hens, pitching to a 3-4 record and 4.62 ERA with 60 strikeouts in 50.2 innings of work. He elected minor league free agency following the season on November 7, 2021.

Minnesota Twins
On December 16, 2021, Pinto signed a minor league contract with the Minnesota Twins organization. He pitched in 25 games for the Triple-A St. Paul Saints, logging a 3-4 record and 2.08 ERA with 43 strikeouts in 34.2 innings pitched. On July 29, 2022, Pinto was released by the Twins organization.

Long Island Ducks
On August 13, 2022, Pinto signed with the Long Island Ducks of the Atlantic League of Professional Baseball.

References

External links

1998 births
Living people
Baseball pitchers
Connecticut Tigers players
Erie SeaWolves players
Gulf Coast Tigers players
Lakeland Flying Tigers players
Mesa Solar Sox players
Minor league baseball players
Toledo Mud Hens players
Venezuelan expatriate baseball players in the United States
Venezuelan Summer League Tigers players
West Michigan Whitecaps players
Sportspeople from Maracay